Raymond Lewis Abruzzese Jr. (October 27, 1937 – August 22, 2011) was an American college and professional football player.

Abruzzese was born in Philadelphia, Pennsylvania.  A defensive back, he played college football at the University of Alabama, and played professionally in the American Football League for the Buffalo Bills from 1962 through 1964, when the Bills won the AFL Championship game, 20–7, over the defending AFL champion San Diego Chargers.  He also played for the AFL's New York Jets in 1965 and 1966.

Abruzzese died in Fort Lauderdale, Florida, aged 73.

See also
List of American Football League players

1937 births
2011 deaths
Players of American football from Philadelphia
American football safeties
Alabama Crimson Tide football players
Buffalo Bills players
New York Jets players
American Football League players